W4JP is the callsign of the amateur radio station operated by the University of Kentucky Amateur Radio Club in room 553 of Anderson Hall (Kentucky). The club traces its history back to 1915. In 1927, the station was relicensed as 9JL (later W9JL).

In the 2000s, the UK Amateur Radio Club and the SSL (Space Systems Laboratory) university groups merged. They kept both names, but have acted mostly under the Space Systems Laboratory.

References

External links
 University of Kentucky Amateur Radio Club official website (archived)
 Space Systems Laboratory
 FCC page for W4JP
 Guide to the University of Kentucky Amateur Radio Club records, housed at the University of Kentucky Libraries Special Collections Research Center

University of Kentucky
Amateur radio organizations